The Widner–Magers Farm is a historic farm property in rural Mississippi County, Arkansas. It is located at 3398 Arkansas North Highway 181, north of the town of Dell. The farmstead includes a number of historically significant agricultural outbuildings, built between the 1910s and 1930s, as well as a heavily altered 1930s farmhouse. The property is a fine local example of a subsistence-level cotton farming operation from the era of the Great Depression, and was listed on the National Register of Historic Places in 2007.

See also
National Register of Historic Places listings in Mississippi County, Arkansas

References

Historic districts on the National Register of Historic Places in Arkansas
Buildings and structures completed in 1912
1912 establishments in Arkansas
National Register of Historic Places in Mississippi County, Arkansas
Farms on the National Register of Historic Places in Arkansas
Cotton industry in the United States